Englebert Fisen (1655 - 15 April 1733) was a Flemish painter and a pupil of Bertholet Flemalle.

Fisen was born at Liège.  When still very young he went to Italy, where he studied under Carlo Maratti, whose style he imitated. After eight years he returned to his native city, where his principal pictures are a Crucifixion, painted for the chapel of the H6tel-de-Ville; and a Martyrdom of St. Bartholomew, and a Christ on the Cross, painted for the church of St. Bartholomew. He died at Liège.

References

 

1655 births
1733 deaths
17th-century painters from the Prince-Bishopric of Liège
18th-century painters from the Prince-Bishopric of Liège
Pupils of Carlo Maratta